Miklós Gelbai (born 23 December 1909, date of death unknown) was a Hungarian boxer. He competed in the men's featherweight event at the 1928 Summer Olympics. At the 1928 Summer Olympics, he lost to Fred Perry of Great Britain.

References

External links
 

1909 births
Year of death missing
Hungarian male boxers
Olympic boxers of Hungary
Boxers at the 1928 Summer Olympics
People from Kecskemét
Featherweight boxers
Sportspeople from Bács-Kiskun County
20th-century Hungarian people